Alasdair Talbert Paterson is a Scottish poet and retired academic librarian. He won an Eric Gregory Award for poetry in 1975 and published several collections before taking a twenty-year break from publication. In his career as a librarian he worked in the universities of Liverpool, Cork and Sheffield, and he held the post of University Librarian at Exeter University. In his last year at Exeter he was also Acting Director of Computing Services. After retirement he resumed publishing with On the governing of empires in 2010.

Paterson was born in Edinburgh, and studied at the universities of Edinburgh and Sheffield.  He has travelled extensively and was involved in several academic projects in Eastern Europe during his career, co-ordinating the E-URALS and KNOWLEDGE projects for TEMPUS in the early 2000s and co-presenting a 2004 seminar series on Innovations in European academic libraries: Issues and contexts in Warsaw. He now lives in Exeter.

Selected publications
Elsewhere or Thereabouts (2014, Shearsman)
In arcadia (2011, Oystercatcher Press)
Brumaire and Later  (2010, Flarestack Poets)
On the governing of empires (2010, Shearsman)
Brief Lives (1987, Oasis Books)
 (1985, Windows Project)
The Floating World: Selected Poems, 1973-82 (1984, Pig Press)
Topiary (1982, Pig Press)
Alps (1981, Oasis Books)
Terra Nova (1979, Interim Press)
Poems for Douanier Rousseau (1975, Glasshouse Press)

References

External links
 A selection of poems

Year of birth missing (living people)
Living people
Scottish librarians
Scottish poets
Alumni of the University of Edinburgh